Michael Marrone (born September 24, 1985) is an American professional boxer. He challenged for the WBA cruiserweight title in 2011.

Beginnings and amateur
As a child Marrone frequented the gym of the Duva family in Florida. He became close to Lou Duva who promoted and represented Marrone. At the National Golden Gloves tournament in 2003 he competed at Heavyweight with 201 lbs limit. He went up to super heavyweight and beat Mike Wilson in the PAL tournament 2003. In the finals he was outpointed by George Garcia, however. His amateur record was 42–9.

Professional career
He turned pro in 2004 at age 18. Marrone's record as of October 2011 is 20-3-0 with 15 knockouts. Marrone scored a victory in April 2007 with an eight-round majority decision against previously undefeated Malachy Farrell in Atlantic City. In May 2008, he lost to Francesco Pianeta in Germany, in two rounds.

In June 2010, Marrone returned to the ring in Miami Beach, FL and scored a fifth round tko against Joseph Rabotte at the Deauville Beach Resort. He lost to Guillermo Jones in a match for the WBA Cruiserweight belt on November 5, 2011. The fight ended in the sixth round, when Marrone's corner asked the referee to stop the fight.

He was set to fight former WBO heavyweight champion Shannon Briggs on September 5, 2015 at the Seminole Hard Rock Hotel & Casino Hollywood in Hollywood, Florida, and eventually lost the fight via KO in the second round.

He was next set to face former heavyweight prospect Chazz Witherspoon at Grundy Arena in Bristol, Florida. After being floored two times in the first round, Marrone was again floored in the second round. Marrone, who was not able to recover from the first knockdown, stood up again, but his corner threw in the towel.

Marrone is currently managed by Jack Luce and trained by Eddie Chambers, Sr. Previously managed and trained by Gus Curren (House of Champions) in Vero Beach.

Professional boxing record

References

External links
 
 Relationship with Duva
 Boom, Lightsout, Mike Marrone's Back!
 Duva’s New Heavyweight Mike Marrone – Hope Or Hype?
 Boxing Tribune Q&A with Michael Marrone on YouTube

1985 births
Living people
American male boxers
American people of Italian descent
Boxers from New Jersey
Boxers from Florida
Heavyweight boxers